Johanna Margaretha Stroomberg (19 May 1919, Amsterdam – 23 May 1984, Amsterdam) was a Dutch swimmer who participated in the 1936 Summer Olympics in the 200 m breaststroke event.

References

1919 births
1984 deaths
Dutch female breaststroke swimmers
Olympic swimmers of the Netherlands
Swimmers at the 1936 Summer Olympics
Swimmers from Amsterdam